Malibu Rescue is an American comedy television series created by Savage Steve Holland and Scott McAboy for Netflix. It premiered as a special feature-length film on May 13, 2019, followed by the first  season on June 3, 2019. Netflix commissioned a second  film in September 2019, Malibu Rescue: The Next Wave, which premiered on August 4, 2020 and ran as the number four watched  movie that week. . The series stars Ricardo Hurtado, Jackie R. Jacobson, Abby Donnelly, Alkoya Brunson and Breanna Yde.

Plot
After getting in trouble one too many times, Tyler's stepfather punishes him by sending him to the Malibu Junior Rescue Program. There, Tyler meets a ragtag group of children from the Valley. Together, the group sets to prove that they deserve to participate in the program along with all the other children from Malibu.

When the program director, Garvin Cross, reveals that he only let Tyler and the rest of the Flounders into the program so that they would fail and he would not have to take children from the Valley anymore, Tyler and the Flounders come together as a team to win a big lifeguard competition and earn their own tower for the spring.

Cast and characters

Main 
 Ricardo Hurtado as Tyler Gossard, an overly-competitive teenage boy, forced to join the Malibu Junior Rescue by his stepfather as punishment
 Jackie R. Jacobson as Dylan, the Flounders' first-time tower captain, who lacks self-confidence and is the first female tower captain
 Abby Donnelly as Lizzie McGrath, a bubbly and spunky teen with a dark side, who has an overprotective mother and is in a relationship with Eric
 Alkoya Brunson as Eric Mitchell, the heart of the group. He is in a relationship with Lizzie.
 Breanna Yde as Gina, a tough and self-assured athlete who tries to live up to her family's legacy of great swimmers

Recurring 
 Ian Ziering as Garvin Cross, the director of the program determined to get the Flounders kicked out of the program
 JT Neal as Brody, a returning tower captain who hates the Flounders and wants them kicked out
 Bryana Salaz as Logan, Brody's friend, who eventually befriends Dylan. She lost her chance to become a tower captain because there is usually only one girl captain
 Jeremy Howard as Vooch, a bus driver and friend of the Flounders who also operates a food truck
 Camaron Engels as Spencer, Brody's friend and captain for Tower 3.
 Zahf Paroo as Thornton Pavey, a rich donor who later runs the Malibu junior rescue program to sabotage the Flounders
 Ryder Blackburn as Beans, a lifeguard friend who seems to always be getting into trouble or sleeping
 Jeff Meacham as Roger Gossard, Tyler's stepfather
 Ella Gross as Sasha Gossard, Tyler's stepsister

Guest

Episodes

Movie (2019)

Season 1 (2019)

Movie (2020)

References

External links
 Pacific Bay Entertainment website
 
 
 
 Malibu Rescue Press Release
 Malibu Rescue at Rotten Tomatoes 
 Malibu Rescue The Series at Rotten Tomatoes
 Malibu Rescue Season 2 Press Release

2019 American television series debuts
2020 American television series endings
2010s American teen sitcoms
2020s American teen sitcoms
American action adventure television series
English-language Netflix original programming
Television shows set in Malibu, California
Television series about teenagers
Television series created by Savage Steve Holland